Jamia Mosque (Arabic: مسجد الجامع),  also known as Grand mosque of Harar is a mosque in Harar, a city in eastern Ethiopia.  It is located in the old walled city, the Harar Jugol, which is a UNESCO World Heritage Site.

History 
Local tradition suggests that the Jamia Mosque is one of the oldest mosque remaining in Harar, while others give it a foundation date of 1216 C.E. Three Harar mosques have been dated to the Tenth Century C.E., but the Jamia Mosque has not been dated.  Archaeological excavation within the mosque perimeter has not been permitted.

The Jamia Mosque was extensively remodeled with the addition of a second minaret in the 16th century probably during the reign (1528–1543) of Ahmad ibn Ibrahim al-Ghazi, who is buried there. Under Amir Abdullahi (1885-1887) the mosque was enlarged. During the Italian occupation (1936-1941) a water pool was added to the courtyard on the east side of the mosque.  The mosque was most recently remodeled in the 1980s, with the addition of a second story.

Notes and references 

Mosques in Ethiopia